Biddulph is a town in Staffordshire, England,  north of Stoke-on-Trent and  south-east of Congleton, Cheshire.

Origin of the name
Biddulph's name may come from Anglo-Saxon/Old English bī dylfe = "beside the pit or quarry". It may also stem from a corruption of the Saxon/Old English Bidulfe, meaning "wolf slayer", and as a result the Biddulph family crest is a wolf rampant.

In the days of coal and iron, Biddulph was actually called Bradley Green, with the original site of Biddulph being the area in which the parish church, Grange House, and the ruins of Biddulph Old Hall stand. It was not until 1930 that the town was marked on Ordnance Survey maps as 'Biddulph'.

Geography

Biddulph is located in a valley between the ridges of Mow Cop and Biddulph Moor to the east and west respectively. Biddulph also encompasses the hamlets of Gillow Heath, Knypersley and Brown Lees.

Education

In common with other parts of the area administered by Staffordshire LEA, the Middle School system operates in Biddulph.

Biddulph has one high school (ages 13 to 16) with a sixth form (ages 16 to 18) called Biddulph High School, it was awarded Sports College status in 2002.  It has since gained Technology College status.  Biddulph also has two middle schools: Woodhouse Middle School (formerly Biddulph Grammar School), and James Bateman Junior High School (formerly Park Middle School), serving pupils aged 9–13.  These are fed by several first schools, such as Kingsfield First School, Knypersley First School, Squirrel Hayes First School, Oxhey First School, and several more.

Recent developments

The supermarket chain Sainsbury's opened a new store in Biddulph in November 2010.

JD Wetherspoons opened The Bradley Green on Biddulph High Street on 3 September 2001.

In addition to the supermarket development, a number of derelict and semi-derelict buildings were refurbished or rebuilt by the local Councils and private owners. These were in line with the intentions set out in the Town Centre Area Action Plan (2007), which aimed to reverse the spiral of decline that had threatened the long-term viability of the town centre since the early 1990s.

A 3000 square metre primary health facility was built for the North Staffordshire Primary Care Trust in the town centre as part of the ongoing regeneration and investment programme.

A new cafe for youngsters, 'Biddulph Young People's Place' opened in March 2011 at Kingsfield First School after a year of planning and fund-raising.

In 2011 Biddulph, which has a population of approx. 20,000, was left without a post office for 4 months when the small supermarket in which it was situated closed down. A temporary Post Office was eventually set up in the town hall car park. A new post office was opened in October 2013 at the northern end of Biddulph High Street.

Transport
Biddulph had its railway station opened by the North Staffordshire Railway in 1864. The station was on the Biddulph Valley Line that ran from a junction just north of Congleton on the Stoke-on-Trent – Macclesfield line to a junction south of Stoke-on-Trent station. Passenger traffic was withdrawn from the station on 11 July 1927, but freight traffic continued until 5 October 1964. There was also a canal rail interchange at Congleton Junction. The remains of the small dock on the Macclesfield Canal can still be seen. The station remains in situ and the platforms as a private residence. With the trackbed forming the Biddulph Valley Way.

The nearest active stations are now in Congleton or Kidsgrove, which provide connections to Birmingham, Crewe, Derby, London Euston, Macclesfield, Manchester, Stafford and Stoke-on-Trent. 

Biddulph is located on the A527, which links it with Congleton in the North and Stoke-on-Trent in the south.

Buses 
D&G Bus provides bus services  to Hanley (No.9) and to Leek (No.93) and the No. 94 goes north to Congleton and south to Tunstall and Newcastle-under-Lyme

First Potteries also provides a bus service  (No.7A) to Hanley.

Main sights

Within the bowl created by the ridges of Mow Cop and Biddulph Moor, the main sights of note include; ancient burial mounds; evidence of the English Civil War; the bubonic plague; the site of the former Black Bull Colliery; tombs of possible Crusader knights; an Iron Age fort; and the site of a meeting of the Methodist movement with the Wesleys.

A dominant feature on hills above the village is Mow Cop Castle, which is a folly of a ruined castle at the summit of the hill built in the 1750s.

Biddulph is also home to Biddulph Grange, a house and landscaped gardens owned by the National Trust. Adjacent to and part of the original estate is Biddulph Grange Country Park.

Notable people

 James Bateman (1811–1897) landowner  and horticulturist, developed Biddulph Grange
 Robert Bateman (1842–1922) painter, architect and horticultural designer.
 Jack Simcock (1929 - 2012) painter, studied at Burslem School of Art, known for "a long series of bleak, sombre oils on board" of the Mow Cop area
 Professor Brian Scarlett (1938–2004) academic  noted for his contributions to particle technology
 Joan Walley (born 1949) Labour Party politician, MP for Stoke-on-Trent North 1987 / 2015.
 Malcolm Bailey (born 1950) former footballer, 174 appearances for Altrincham F.C. 
 John Farmer (born 1947) former footballer, made 163 appearances for Stoke City F.C.
 Phil Dowd (born 1963) retired  professional football referee
 Rob Bailey (born 1963) cricket umpire  and former player for Northants & England
 James Wilson (born 1995) professional footballer, plays for Port Vale and previously played for Manchester United.

Twin towns

Biddulph is twinned with:
  Fusignano, Italy

See also
Listed buildings in Biddulph

References

External links

 
Towns in Staffordshire
Civil parishes in Staffordshire
Staffordshire Moorlands
Towns and villages of the Peak District